Laura X (born Laura Rand Orthwein, Jr.; in St. Louis, Missouri, in 1940), is a women's rights advocate. Laura X changed her name in 1962 to Laura Shaw Murra, which remains her legal name. She took the name Laura X, on September 17, 1969, to symbolize her rejection of men's legal ownership of women and the anonymity of women's history, which she said was stolen from women and girls. She declared that, like Malcolm X, "I don't want to have my owner's name, either."

Education and Background
After attending Vassar College for three years, Orthwein moved to New York City, became a Head Start Program teacher in the pilot program, having trained at the University of Puerto Rico. She also rose to Picket Captain in CORE (Congress of Racial Equality), attended New York University (NYU), and took graduate courses at Bank Street College of Education. Following her interests and research developed at Vassar College, she worked with the American Committee on Africa to welcome delegates from 17 newly independent states, 16 from Africa, join the UN and to picket Chase Manhattan Bank about their investments in South Africa. In 1963, she moved to Berkeley, California, and graduated from the University of California, Berkeley (UC-Berkeley), in 1971, having participated in the Free Speech Movement as well as other social justice movements. She participated in, and documented, 21 other social movements until 2020.

Women's History Research Center
Laura X is the founder and was the director of the Women's History Research Center, in Berkeley, California, which was the first historical archive connected to the Women's liberation movement. Laura X founded the Women's History Research Center in 1968. In February 1969, after a University of California, Berkeley, professor expressed doubt that there was enough material on women to fill a quarter's course in sociology, she provided him with a thousand names of women in world history: “Herstory Synopsis.” The list inspired a Berkeley Women's Liberation demonstration (see photo) on March 8, 1969, to revive International Women's Day in the US. Because the resulting publicity caused women from 40 countries to send her their documents of the emerging women’s movement, according to some sources, Laura X is responsible for the US revival of International Women's Day (IWD) in 1969.

Dr. Judith Ezekiel wrote about Laura X in this moment: “The radical press picked it up and by the next year, she says, there were some 30 protests around the country. Simultaneously, she began receiving feminist literature and documents from around the world that fed into her new International Women’s Liberation Archives." 

The revival caused Laura X to call for a National Women's History Month in March because of International Women’s Day being in March. She was also inspired by Black History Month in February.

By 1970 the Women's History Research Center was widely listed in early feminist publications. The Center put many of the early feminist writings on microfilm, making them available in libraries across the country. The Women's History Research Center eventually closed, and its collections are now held in the women's history archive at the Schlesinger Library, which is part of Harvard University's Radcliffe Institute for Advanced Study, and at other institutions. The microfilm copies have been distributed through Primary Source Media/Cengage Learning to some 450 libraries in fourteen countries.

Women's Institute for Freedom of the Press
In 1977, Laura X became an associate of the Women's Institute for Freedom of the Press (WIFP). WIFP is an American nonprofit publishing organization. The organization works to increase communication between women and connect the public with forms of women-based media.

National Clearinghouse on Marital and Date Rape
In 1978 the Women's History Research Center established the National Clearinghouse on Marital and Date Rape in Berkeley, California, with Laura X as director.

Marital and Date Rape Legislation
In 1979 Laura X led a successful campaign to make marital rape a crime in California.  She also acted as a consultant to 45 other state campaigns on marital and date rape, as well as collecting and maintaining documents about the status of exemptions from prosecution in rape laws. Repeal of date and marital rape exemptions occurred in 45 states, in Federal and military law, in the laws of Guam and Puerto Rico, and the laws of twenty other countries.

As the leader of NCMDR’s campaign against marital rape, Laura X appeared on dozens of local and national TV and radio shows, including 60 Minutes, The Phil Donahue Show, Seattle Today, Sally Jessie Raphael, Geraldo, the Today Show, CBS News, and the Gary Collins show.

In September 1999 Laura X published her memoir "Accomplishing the Impossible: an Advocate's Notes from the Successful Campaign to Make Marital and Date Rape a Crime in All 50 U.S. States and Other Countries" in Violence Against Women: An International and Interdisciplinary Journal.

Awards and Recognitions

As Laura Rand Orthwein, in 1959 she was Queen of the Veiled Prophet Ball in St. Louis, Missouri. 

In recognition of her achievements, Laura X received
 Commendation by the American Library Association, 1971 
 Woman of Achievement award (from Mademoiselle Magazine)
 World Congress of Victimology Award for Innovative Programs and Services.
 Commendation Surgeon General C. Everett Koop, 1985.
 In 2009, Laura X was honored by the University of Missouri St. Louis (UMSL) with the Trailblazers Award.

References 

American feminists
21st-century American historians
History of women in Missouri
Feminist historians
American women historians
Vassar College alumni
Writers from Berkeley, California
Writers from St. Louis
1940 births
Living people
21st-century American women writers
Orthwein business family